Hajrudin is a Bosnian masculine given name. Notable people with the name include: 

 Hajrudin Ćatić (born 1975), Bosnian footballer
 Hajrudin Đurbuzović (born 1956), Bosnian football manager and former player
 Hajrudin Krvavac (born 1929 - died 1992), Bosnian film director
 Hajrudin Saračević (born 1949), Bosnian football player
 Hajrudin Somun (born 1937), Bosnian journalist and diplomat
 Hajrudin Varešanović (born 1961), Bosnian rock vocalist

Bosnian masculine given names